The Virginia Belles is the University of Virginia's oldest all-female a cappella group based in Charlottesville, Virginia. The group was established in 1977 by Katherine Mitchell as the female counterpart to the Virginia Gentlemen, the university's oldest a cappella group. Completely student-run, the Belles continue to perform an eclectic range of vocal music from oldies and classic rock to indie and R&B. They sing in and around Charlottesville, and up and down the East Coast and all across the U.S. (often wearing little black dresses),  and have received awards and honors from internationally acclaimed organizations such as the Contemporary A Cappella Society, Varsity Vocals, and the Recorded A Cappella Review Board.

History 
The Belles were founded in the fall of 1977 by Katherine Mitchell, a student at the University of Virginia. A woman who continues to love music, Katherine noticed then that there was no outlet for female a cappella at the university. The Virginia Gentlemen, the university's oldest all-male a cappella group had been established since 1953, so Katherine formed The Virginia Belles as the female counterpart to the Virginia Gentlemen. Initially the Belles were a select part of the Virginia Women's Chorus. The most talented members of the Women's Chorus were asked to audition for the Belles, singing both madrigal and popular music. Today, the Belles hold auditions every semester for every female student at the university to attend.

The Belles Today 
The Belles today are a Contracted Independent Organization run through UVA's student council and are no longer a part of the Women's Chorus. The group is entirely student-run and affiliated with the UVA McIntire Department of Music. The Belles sing for almost every type of occasion, be it fundraising events on Grounds, private parties, weddings, sports events, concerts, or business meetings. The Belles are known for wearing their signature "little black dresses" to perform around the country.

The Belles are currently signed with A Cappella Records, an all-digital record label for a cappella music. Their music can be purchased on iTunes and Amazon.com.

Fall Roll
The Belles tour the East Coast every year on a trip they call Fall Roll, visiting numerous other schools, colleges, and universities. Past trips have included visits with the Princeton Footnotes, Vanderbilt Melodores, The Baker's Dozen of Yale University, Cornell Men of Last Call, William and Mary's The Gentlemen of the College, Virginia Tech Juxtaposition, The UNC Achordants, etc. The University of Virginia's Fall Break is always reserved for this excursion.

CD Production
The Belles record and release a new CD biyearly. They have released numerous CDs throughout the years, garnering praise and national acclaim from fans and the a cappella community. Their repertoire today continues to be an eclectic mix of all different genres of music.

Up until 2007, the group spent their recording career with accomplished sound engineers Paul Brier and Chris Doermann, formerly of Virginia Arts Recording in Charlottesville, VA. However, with the release of Taking Every Detour, the group switched the production studios of both Brier and UVA alum James Gammon with James Gammon Productions. With their album acaBELLEa, James Gammon Productions took over the entire recording, editing, production, and mastering processes. James Gammon is an alumnus of The Academical Village People, an all-male a cappella group at the University of Virginia. His clients have won many national and international a cappella awards thanks to his success in the studio.

Awards

Musical Awards
Contemporary A Cappella Recording Awards (CARAs)

|-
|rowspan="3"| 2016 || Right Hook || Best Female Collegiate Album || 
|-
|Jasleen Bawa for "Team" (Right Hook) || Best Female Collegiate Soloist || 
|-
|Brianna Meese, Michelle Gahagan for "Don't Wake Me Up" (Right Hook)|| Best Female Collegiate Arrangement || 
|-
|rowspan="4"| 2014 || Tintinnabulation || Best Female Collegiate Album || 
|-
|"Fire" (Tintinnabulation) || Best Female Collegiate Song || 
|-
|Jasleen Bawa for "Winter Trees" (Tintinnabulation) || Best Female Collegiate Soloist || 
|-
|Michelle Gahagan for "Winter Trees" (Tintinnabulation)|| Best Female Collegiate Arrangement || 
|-
| 2012 || "Love, Save the Empty" (Good Morning, Mr. Jefferson) || Best Female Collegiate Song || 
|-
| 2010 || acaBELLEa || Best Female Collegiate Album || 
|-
| 2002 || Aurora || Best Female Collegiate Album (Runner Up) || 
|-
|rowspan="4"| 2000 || Bellissima || Best Female Collegiate Album (Runner Up) || 
|-
|"Fast Car" (Bellissima) || Best Female Collegiate Song || 
|-
|Heather Bates for (Bellissima) || Best Female Collegiate Soloist || 
|-

Recorded A Cappella Review Board (RARB)

|-
| 2009 || "Big Girls Don’t Cry" (acaBELLEa) || 2009 Song of the Year ||

Selection for "Best Of" Compilation Albums
Best of College A Cappella (BOCA)

|-
| 2014 || "Fire" (Tintinnabulation) || BOCA 2014: Best of College A Cappella || 

Voices Only A Cappella Compilation

|-
| 2015 || "Goodness Gracious" (Right Hook) || Voices Only 2015, Vol. 2 || 
|-
| 2014 || "Do My Thing" (Tintinnabulation) || Voices Only 2014, Vol. 1 || 
|-
| 2013 || "Rumour Has It" (Tintinnabulation) || Voices Only 2013, Vol. 1 || 
|-
| 2011 || "Love, Save the Empty" (Good Morning, Mr. Jefferson) || Voices Only 2011, Vol. 2 ||

A Cappella Competitions
International Competitive Collegiate A Cappella (ICCAs)

|-
| 2003 || Virginia Belles || ICCA Quarter-Finals—3rd Place || 
|-
|rowspan="3"| 2001 || Virginia Belles || ICCA Semi-Finals—2nd Place || 
|-
| My-Van Nguyen || Outstanding Vocal Percussion || 
|-
| Lindsay Wilkonson || Outstanding Soloist || 
|-
| 2000 || Virginia Belles || ICCA Quarter-Finals—3rd Place ||

Discography 
Woman (2019)
Lightning in a Bottle (2017)
Right Hook (2015)
Five - EP (2015)
Tintinnabulation (2013)
Good Morning Mr. Jefferson (2011)
acaBELLEa (2009)
Taking Every Detour (2007)
Essentially Covered (2005)
Sterling (2003)
Aurora (2001)
Bellissima (1999)
Dig (1997)
ReBELLEion (1995)
Bar Belles (1992)
Belle Bottoms (1991)
AcaBELLEa (1990)

Notable alumni
 Kelleigh Bannen - musician, solo artist
 Jia Tolentino - author, editor

More A Cappella at UVA
Virginia Gentlemen - all male
Hullabahoos - all male
The Academical Village People - all male
Virginia Sil'hooettes - all female
Hoos In Treble - all female
The New Dominions - co-ed
CHoosE - Christian
Remix - hip - hop
Achoostics - all female philanthropy
Harmonious Hoos All-Gender A Cappella

References

External links 
The Official Virginia Belles Website

Collegiate a cappella groups
University of Virginia musical groups
Musical groups established in 1977
1977 establishments in Virginia
Women in Virginia